The Battle of Nirmohgarh was fought between Sikhs and the Mughal Empire in 1702.

Background
The Imperial Mughal Army was defeated in the bloody Battle of Anandpur (1700). After hearing the news about the defeat of the Mughal Army in the battle, Aurangzeb personally himself sent a fresh army under Wazir Khan against Guru Gobind Singh. Wazir Khan thus proceeded with a large number of troops, reinforced by the Hill Rajas of the Sivalik Hills.

The Battle
Wazir Khan met the Sikhs just outside Anandpur on the banks of the River Sutlej at Nirmohgarh. The Mughals attacked the Guru from one side and the Hill Rajas attacked them from the other side. The fight continued fiercely for the whole day and at night until eventually the combined forces of the Mughals and Hill Rajas were exhausted and were compelled to retreat.

The next morning, the Mughals and the Hill Raja's forces restarted the attacking and Guru Gobind Singh, finding himself greatly outnumbered, decided to retire from the place. The enemy troops pursued him and the Sikhs decided to give them another final battle in which the combined forces of Mughals and Hill Rajas were decisively defeated and the imperial Mughal army was forced to withdraw after two days of fighting.

References

Conflicts in 1702
Battles involving the Mughal Empire
Battles involving the Sikhs